Pyaar Mein Twist (English: A Twist in Love) is a 2005 Bollywood romantic comedy film directed by Hriday Shetty and starring Rishi Kapoor, Dimple Kapadia, Sammir Dattani, Kishori Shahane, Vikas Bhalla and the British artist Emma Bunton.

Synopsis
Yash Khurana is the chief executive and owner of Tejpal Industries, a hugely successful auto firm. Yash is stepping down as CEO, in order to enjoy retirement. He gave the responsibility and authority to run the family business to his son, Rajiv, a well trained and highly educated executive, but insecure, who feels the pressure of trying to fill his father's shoes in running the family business. When Yash is walking his dogs and crossing at a busy intersection, a car almost hits him. He is irate, calls the police and berates the woman driver, Sheetal, who laughing, points out to the policeman that it is against the law to walk two dogs at the same time. When they get home, Yash and Sheetal each describe the day's main event to their families. Little do they realize that their paths will cross again.

They share more in common than either of them realize – each lost a spouse and is totally devoted to their families, putting them first in their lives and made great sacrifices to keep the families together. Sheetal is planning the marriage of her oldest daughter Riya to Sanju, the son of a wealthy upper-class family. Sanju's mother, Madhu does not support his marriage and feels he is marrying beneath his social class. She is creating delays, hoping to break up their plans, but he defy his mother's authority and states he will elope with Ria if his family puts up obstacles. Sheetal and Yash meet again and feel they are in love. They go out on a date and are seen dancing and dining at a Moroccan restaurant. A friend of Madhu reports this to her and she uses it as yet another excuse to delay the date for the marriage of her son.

The children of both Sheetal and Yash are irate over their relationship and suspect it may be a secret love affair of a long time carried on behind their backs. Toshi, Sheetal's sister-in-law advises them to run away and travel together. After a while, their children are able to trace them, but Yash declares they want to marry each other and everyone accept it. Sanju ignores his mother and marries Riya. In the wedding he meets Kylie Milligan, an international movie star, hired by his mother to liven up the party, and shows interest in her, starting new confusions in his married life.

Cast
Rishi Kapoor as Yash Khurana 
Dimple Kapadia as Sheetal Arya   
Sameer Dattani as Sanju Loc   
Soha Ali Khan as Riya Arya   
Kishori Shahane as Madhu Loc   
Vikas Bhalla as Rajiv Khurana   
Emma Bunton as Kylie Milligan   
Harish Patel as Raj Loc    
Farida Jalal as Toshi Arya   
Delnaaz Paul as Dolly Arya   
Deepshika as Parul Rajiv Khurana

Soundtrack

Reception
Indrani Roy Mitra of Rediff.com called the film ″Good Stuff″, writing ″Pyaar Mein Twist may not appeal to teenagers. For those on the wrong side of 40, however, it will touch a few chords. As for me, it was a tryst with long forgotten childhood stars. And that's always a good thing.″ The Telegraph wrote ″The acting by the rest of the cast is commendable. Vikas Bhalla makes a strong comeback as Rishi's son. Soha Ali Khan has a couple of scenes and she does them well. So does Sammir Dattani. Farida Jalal is lovely. Lifted or original, kudos to director Hriday Shetty for attempting a theme like this in the Bollywood scheme of things. Jatin-Lalit's music is a big letdown. Apart from Pal tham gaya, no song has any recall value. A good score could have worked wonders. The pacing is too slow, especially the second half. Two songs can be easily chopped off for smarter impact. Don't miss: Emma "Spice" Bunton making a special appearance in the sagaai song very early in the film. Last word: Go for the old wine in the old bottle itself after all, it's a taste that grows on you.″ Taran Adarsh of Bollywood Hungama gave the film 2.5 stars out of 5, writing ″On the whole, PYAAR MEIN TWIST is a cute film that charters a seldomly-treaded path vis-ï¿½-vis its story. At the box-office, it holds appeal for families mainly, although several new openers on the same date will result in the business getting divided.″

References

External links
 

2000s Hindi-language films
Films scored by Jatin–Lalit
2005 films